The Shafie cabinet of Sabah took office on 16 May 2018.

The cabinet consists of ministers and assistant ministers from the Sabah Heritage Party (WARISAN), the United Progressive Kinabalu Organisation (UPNO), Democratic Action Party (DAP) and People's Justice Party (PKR).

Current arrangement, 2018–2020

Ministers

Assistant Ministers

References 

Politics of Sabah
Cabinets established in 2018